Eugene William "Moe" Ollrich (June 30, 1922 – June 16, 2008) was an American professional basketball player. After a collegiate career at Drake University, Ollrich played for the NBA's Waterloo Hawks, appearing in 14 games during the 1949–50 season.

References

1922 births
2008 deaths
American men's basketball players
United States Army personnel of World War II
Basketball players from Illinois
Basketball players from Indiana
Drake Bulldogs men's basketball players
Guards (basketball)
People from Whiting, Indiana
Waterloo Hawks players